Waldemar Rezmer (born 1949) is a Polish historian. A professor at the Nicolaus Copernicus University in Toruń, he specializes in the modern military history, particularly Polish, Lithuanian and Soviet.

References

External links

1949 births
Nicolaus Copernicus University in Toruń alumni
Academic staff of Nicolaus Copernicus University in Toruń
Living people
21st-century Polish historians
Polish male non-fiction writers
20th-century Polish historians